Graphops beryllina is a species of leaf beetle. It is found in North America.

References

Further reading

 

Eumolpinae
Articles created by Qbugbot
Beetles described in 1884
Taxa named by John Lawrence LeConte
Beetles of the United States